Mishu Chowdhury  (Birth: 3rd March, 1990) is a Bangladeshi ex-women cricketer, umpire, sports anchor and actress. She is also one of the first Bangladeshi women umpires. She played in national cricket leagues from 2008 to 2012 but retired due to ligament injury. Later she took on sports anchoring and acting. She acted in '71 Er Ma Jononi and several other films as well as numerous TV dramas.

Career 
Mishu Chowdhury was born in Bogura. Her original name is Mst. Rokeya Sultana and nickname is Mishu Chowdhury. After completion of her intermediate examination, she came to Dhaka for higher studies. She completed her graduation in Accounting from Eden Mohila College, Dhaka. Mishu had started her acting career in Bogra Theatre early in her life. She acted in 5 plays there, the last one being Nuruldiner Sarajibon (2009). She took up stage performance again in 2016 in the play Surgao for Desh Natok.

Mishu had joined the Bogra district women's cricket team in 2006. As an all-rounder cricketer, she played in Club Cup for Mohammedan Sporting Club, Azad Sporting Club and Indira Road Krira Chokro; District Cup for Bogra district and Division Cup for Sylhet Division. In 2012 she had to retire from cricket due to a ligament injury. She also played Open Badminton singles & Doubles tournament.

While in her cricket career, Mishu starred in a telefilm Shudhu Tumi in 2012. Later she took on acting professionally with the film '71 Er Ma Jononi. Till now she has acted in 5 films and more than 70 television dramas. She has also acted in several television commercials among which is Grameenphone's Sob Kotha Jomaya Rakh directed by Amitabh Reza Chowdhury. She regularly hosts sports programs as well.

Apart from sports and media, Mishu is also teaching in an English-medium school.
She is writing a book on women's cricket in Bangladesh which is due to be published in February 2022.

On 29th October 2022, Mishu was one of the four first Bangladeshi woman umpires.

Mishu got the Best Popular Anchor award and an honorific emblem as actress by Business File. She was also given Grameenphone 'Balance for Better' inspiration award in 2019.

Filmography

Feature films

Stage performances

Sporting anchoring

Television commercial

Television drama (serial)

Television drama (single)

References

External links 

Bengali television actresses
Bangladeshi television actresses
Bangladeshi actresses
1990 births
Living people